Michael Steven Lapper (born August 28, 1970 in Redondo Beach, California) is an American retired soccer defender. During his fifteen-year playing career, most of it spent as a sweeper, he played in England, Germany and the United States.  He earned 44 caps, scoring one goal, with the U.S. national soccer team between 1991 and 1995.  He was part of the U.S. teams at both the 1992 Summer Olympics and the 1994 FIFA World Cup.

Player

Youth
Lapper played youth soccer in the North Huntington Beach Untouchables youth club.  He graduated from Marina High in Huntington Beach.  Lapper played collegiate soccer at UCLA from 1988 to 1991.  While a Bruin, Lapper won the 1990 National Championship, earning first team All American honors.  While in college, Lapper also played with the local Los Angeles Heat of the Western Soccer League in 1988 and 1989.  He was a WSL First Team All-Star in 1989.

International
Lapper made his debut for the United States on April 7, 1991 against South Korea.

Lapper played for the U.S. 1991 Pan American Games gold medal soccer team, the 1992 Summer Olympics soccer team and the 1995 Copa America team which placed fourth at that tournament.  In 1993, he played every U.S. game as a sweeper.  When Bora Milutinović moved to a flat-back four defensive scheme, Lapper found himself relegated to the bench in favor of Alexi Lalas.  However, he did make the U.S. team which played as host in the 1994 FIFA World Cup.  This team advanced to the second round where it lost to Brazil, but Lapper failed to enter any of the U.S. games.

He played several more matches at the end of 1994 and into 1995, but on August 16, 1995, he earned his last cap in a losing match to Sweden.  He ended his national team career with 44 and scored one goal.

Europe
Lapper began his professional career in 1994 with German Second Division club VfL Wolfsburg in Germany (1994–95). On a side note, he scored in his debut game with that team.  He continued to start for Wolfsburg until coach Eckhard Krautzun, who had sought Lapper's services, was fired by team management.  Lapper soon found himself in the position of so many American players in Europe during those years. The new manager, Gerd Roggensack, had no interest in American soccer players and Lapper found himself unable to even make the substitute list.  At the time that Krautzun was fired, Wolfsburg stood at the top of the German Second Division. By the end of the season, it had slipped to fourth and failed to win promotion to the First Division.  Lapper requested a transfer and in 1995, the team sent him to British Second Division club Southend United for £100,000.  At the time, Southend was pushing for promotion to the Premiership, but when it actually faced demotion to the second division in 1997, Lapper left Southend to sign with Major League Soccer (MLS). However, he did have a final stint within English soccer, when Halifax Town signed him on a rolling contract in late 1999. His time at the club proved unsuccessful and he soon returned to the U.S.

Major League Soccer
When Lapper signed with MLS, the league allocated him in June 1997 to the Columbus Crew.  While with that team, he played 110 games, starting 99, until his retirement in 2002.  Additionally, he scored five goals and assisted on 10 more.

Post-playing career 
After retiring from playing, he joined the Columbus Crew's front office as the Director of Soccer Business Development, which focuses on the growth of the Crew's camps, clinics and soccer academies. During the 2005, season he officially joined the coaching staff. Following the 2013 MLS season, Lapper parted ways with the Crew and became a member of the West Virginia University men's soccer staff.

References

External links
 
 

1970 births
Living people
Sportspeople from Redondo Beach, California
Western Soccer Alliance players
Los Angeles Heat players
All-American men's college soccer players
American soccer players
American expatriate soccer players
Columbus Crew players
Southend United F.C. players
VfL Wolfsburg players
2. Bundesliga players
UCLA Bruins men's soccer players
Olympic soccer players of the United States
Footballers at the 1992 Summer Olympics
1992 King Fahd Cup players
1993 Copa América players
1994 FIFA World Cup players
1995 Copa América players
United States men's international soccer players
Soccer players from California
American expatriate sportspeople in England
American expatriate soccer players in Germany
Major League Soccer players
United States men's under-23 international soccer players
Columbus Crew non-playing staff
Association football defenders
Expatriate footballers in England
West Virginia Mountaineers men's soccer coaches
Footballers at the 1991 Pan American Games
Medalists at the 1991 Pan American Games
Pan American Games gold medalists for the United States
Pan American Games medalists in football